is a Japanese gymnast and Olympic gold medalist. Nakayama was born in Nagoya, Aichi Prefecture, and is a graduate of Chukyo University in Nagoya. Nakayama is one of only two gymnasts to become an Olympic Champion in rings twice, the first to do so being Albert Azaryan.

He won six medals at the World Championships in 1966, including three gold medals in the team all-around, the floor exercise and the horizontal bar. Two years later, with four gold, one silver and one bronze medals he became the most successful male athlete at the 1968 Summer Olympics. In 1970, he won another four world titles: in team competition, on rings, floor and parallel bars. He won four more medals at the 1972 Summer Olympics.

After retirement he was the vice-president of the Japanese Gymnastics Federation. He also served as a gymnastics coach at his alma mater, Chukyo University. In 2005, he was inducted into the International Gymnastics Hall of Fame.

Competitive history

See also

List of multiple Olympic gold medalists
List of multiple Olympic gold medalists at a single Games
List of multiple Olympic medalists
 List of Olympic medal leaders in men's gymnastics

References

1943 births
Living people
Japanese male artistic gymnasts
Olympic gymnasts of Japan
Gymnasts at the 1968 Summer Olympics
Gymnasts at the 1972 Summer Olympics
Olympic gold medalists for Japan
Olympic silver medalists for Japan
Olympic bronze medalists for Japan
Olympic medalists in gymnastics
World champion gymnasts
Medalists at the World Artistic Gymnastics Championships
Sportspeople from Nagoya
Medalists at the 1972 Summer Olympics
Medalists at the 1968 Summer Olympics
Universiade medalists in gymnastics
Universiade gold medalists for Japan
Medalists at the 1965 Summer Universiade
20th-century Japanese people
21st-century Japanese people